Fakhrul Imam is a Bangladeshi politician and the incumbent Member of Parliament from Mymensingh-8. He is also known as one of the most veteran parliamentarians in Bangladesh.

Imam was elected to Parliament from Mymensingh-8 as a Jatiya Party candidate in 1988, 2014 and re-elected on 30 December 2018.

References

Living people
4th Jatiya Sangsad members
10th Jatiya Sangsad members
11th Jatiya Sangsad members
Jatiya Party politicians
1948 births